Shakardara District is situated in the central part of Kabul Province, Afghanistan. It has a population of 3,000 people, with another 10,000 expected to return from abroad (2002 official UNHCR est.).

Shakardara district borders Parvan Province to the west, Guldara District to the north, Mir Bacha Kot, Deh Sabz and Kabul districts to the east, and Paghman District to the south. Its headquarters is the village of Shakar Dara, which is located in the central part of the district. The agriculture is the main source of income.

In December 2009, the district was declared close to "Poppy-free" by the Afghan Ministry of Counternarcotics. This result was rewarded by the ceremonial opening of a  asphalt road, completed by the ministry, which will allow local farmers to transport their products to a market in a remote portion of Shakardara District (under the Karzai administration each time a province in Afghanistan reduces or eliminates its poppy crop, the inhabitants benefit from new roads, schools, irrigation systems, or farming equipment).

In 2009, poppy cultivation in the whole Kabul province fell by 57%, and Kabul was said to be close to being named "poppy free" by the end of the year.

On 17 May 2010 Pamir Airways Flight 112 crashed on a mountainside in the district.

References

External links
AIMS District Map

Districts of Kabul Province